Paltan (also Romanized as Palţān and Paltān; also known as Balţān) is a village in Goli Jan Rural District, in the Central District of Tonekabon County, Mazandaran Province, Iran. At the 2006 census, its population was 347, in 89 families.

References 

Populated places in Tonekabon County